Allan Gunn (23 November 1943 – 2004) was an English football referee in the Football League, Premier League, and for FIFA. During his time on the List he was based in Sussex, initially Burgess Hill and later Chailey, near Lewes. Prior to officiating Gunn played as a left-winger for Sussex County League side Whitehawk.

Career
Gunn became a Football League linesman in 1974 and two years later made the Supplementary Referees List. After a successful season at that level he was promoted to the full List in 1977.

Over the next few years he made frequent appearances in the then Football League Division One. In 1986, he was senior linesman to Alan Robinson in the FA Cup Final between Everton and Liverpool. He replaced the retiring Robinson on the FIFA list for the following season (1986–87).

He took charge of an increasing number of key domestic games. In 1987, he refereed the Associate Members' Cup Final between Mansfield and Bristol City. This was the first professional English Cup Final to be settled by a penalty shoot-out. Two years later, in April 1989, he handled the Final of the Full Members' Cup (a short-lived tournament for sides in the top two divisions) in which Nottingham Forest overcame Everton 4–3. He was appointed to the Charity Shield a few months later. Many referees who have handled this game have shortly after graduated to the FA Cup Final and he got his chance at the end of that season (1989–90). The Final between Manchester United and Crystal Palace ended 3–3 after extra time, and he also refereed the rather low-key replay, won by United 1–0.

On the international scene, he was referee for a number of club ties but his most notable match was a World Cup qualifier in April 1989 in which Portugal beat Switzerland 3–1.

Originally he was due to retire at the end of the 1990–91 season. However, in common with a number of high-performing referees at that time, he was granted an extension. This gave him a few more months at FIFA level before the world body reduced its own retirement age to 45 and, along with many other referees, he had to stand down at the end of 1991. However, he continued to referee in England. He was chosen for the new Premier League in 1992, and in 1993 took charge of the League Cup Final between Arsenal and Sheffield Wednesday.

He was then granted a further domestic extension. Early in 1994, though, he decided to retire at the end of the season at the age of 51, after a 17-year career on the full List. He accepted an offer from the FA in 2000 to become a member of the video panel reviewing match events and disciplinary matters. He died in 2004.

References

Print

Football League Handbooks, 1974–1976
Rothmans Football Yearbooks, 1977–1994
Gilbert Upton (2005) Football League and Premiership Referees 1888 to 2005: a Reference Resource, Soccerdata

Internet

External links
 
 Alan Gunn referee profile at Premier League
 

1943 births
People from Burgess Hill
Whitehawk F.C. players
English football referees
FA Cup Final referees
2004 deaths
English Football League referees
Premier League referees
Association football midfielders
English footballers